Pipa Beach (Praia de Pipa in Portuguese) is one of the most famous beaches of Brazil. Located next to city of Natal, the capital city of state of Rio Grande do Norte. Is located more precisely in municipality of Tibau do Sul, exactly 84 km from the capital of the state.

History 
The first maps of the coastline drawn by Portuguese settlers, refer to Pipa Beach as Orotapiry, or "White man's village." In 1626, the beach became known as Itacoatiara, meaning "the painted cliff", later becoming Ponta do Cabo Verde ("Green Headland"), and is now Praia da Pipa, or "Pipa Beach", which means "Kite Beach" (in a literal translation). "Pipa" is the European Portuguese word for "barrel". The story behind the current name tells that when the Portuguese were sailing close to the beach, they could see a big, barrel-shaped rock and that's how the new name was adopted. 

Pipa was a small fishing village until the 1970s. Then it was discovered by surfers and backpackers, attracted by a set of natural attributes rarely found even in other Brazilian beaches: crystal-clear waters, fine, white sand, areas of preservation Atlantic Forest, 10-meter-high vertical cliffs, and friendly locals. However, one should be very careful with the strong currents in the sea and the huge waves loved by the surfers but really dangerous for those willing to enjoy these warm waters. 

After the Brazilians, it was the foreign visitors who discovered Pipa, which grew very fast. Soon, it became not only one of the most popular beaches in Brazil, but also one of the most cosmopolitan.

Today, many businesses in Pipa are run by foreigners who visited the town and decided to stay. Pipa, still small in area (expansion is limited by law, with the creation of Environmental Protected Areas around the village), has a high density of hotels, restaurants, bars and other tourism-oriented businesses.

Success has also brought problems to the community. The large influx of visitors and new dwellers was not matched by investments in infrastructure. Transit is slow, public sewage is not well established, prices are high and despite attempts of protection by law, the environment is threatened by the expansion. This is due to change as development laws have become even stricter due to the actions of environmentalists and various public works programs such as the construction of a ring road (on existing roads) to ease traffic congestion are going ahead.

Gallery

External links
 Website and travel guide
 Website and travel guide with videos
 How to go from Natal to Pipa
 Pipa Travel Report
 Information, maps and accommodation
  Surf information camp and school of stand up paddle 
  Iformações e acomodações na praia de pipa 
 Map of Pipa

Beaches of Brazil
Populated places in Rio Grande do Norte
Landforms of Rio Grande do Norte